This article contains the list of chairmen of the State Duma of Russia.

The post of Chairman of the State Duma existed in Russia two times. First time in the Russian Empire from 1906 to 1917, during this period the post of Chairman was occupied by 5 people. The second time, in the Russian Federation since 1993.

By party affiliation are:
One: Agrarian Party, Communist Party and Party of Russia's Rebirth
Two: Constitutional Democratic Party
Three: Union of October 17 and United Russia

Current Chairman Vyacheslav Volodin was elected October 5, 2016 and re–elected October 12, 2021.

List

Chairmen by time in office

The Fathers and Mothers of the house who started the new legislatures

Traditionally when a new Russian parliament is formed the eldest deputy opens the first session until a chairman or a speaker is elected. In 2021, Valentina Tereshkova became the first Mother of the house.

In the history of the post-Soviet Dumas these were:

References

Russia, State Duma
State Duma, chairmen